Zrinska gora is a mountain in central Croatia.

See also
 Zrin

References

Mountains of Croatia
Landforms of Sisak-Moslavina County
Banovina